Phang Nga is one of the southern provinces (changwat) of Thailand, on the shore of the Andaman Sea to the west and Phang Nga Bay to the south. Neighboring provinces are (from north, clockwise) Ranong, Surat Thani, and Krabi. To the south is the Phuket province, connected by the Sarasin Bridge.

Geography
The province is on the west side of the Malay Peninsula and includes the islands of the Phang Nga Bay. Ao Phang Nga (Phang Nga Bay) National Park was established in 1981 to protect the many islands. The Similan Islands and Surin Islands, two of Thailand's main diving destinations, are also part of Phang Nga province.

Toponymy
Phang Nga is the modern Thai transliteration of the archaic Malay word Pangan, literally 'jungle'. The phrase orang Pangan denotes 'heathen, pagan, primitive people', in reference to a generalised tribe or people typically inhabiting jungle areas of the Malay Peninsula  and its offshore islands.

History
Historically, during the reign of King Rama II, nearby areas (including Thalang, now known as Phuket) were occupied by the Burmese and so many people fled to Kraphu Nga. In 1824 when Siamese troops defeated the Burmese and they were expelled, King Rama III renamed the area adjacent to the bay phang-nga. This bastardisation of Malay pangan offers indicates that the entire region may have been populated by Orang Asli or other aboriginal peoples. In 1933 the town was promoted to provincial status.

On the morning of 26 December 2004 the Andaman Sea coastline of the province was devastated by a tsunami and thousands lost their lives.

The Khura Buri District, particularly Ko Phra Thong, has been called a "smuggler's paradise" and thus a key entry point into Thailand for human trafficking, Rohingya, Uighur, and Syrian refugees particularly.

Symbols

The provincial seal shows the Phu Khao Chang mountains in the background with city hall in front. It also shows a dredge to represent the tin mining in the province.

The provincial slogan is, "Massive mining industry, Ban Klang Nam 'floating house', delightful caves, strangely shaped hills, Jampun flower, rich in resources".

The provincial tree is Cinnamomum porrectum (hardy cinnamon), and the provincial flower is Anaxagorea javanica.

Administrative divisions

Provincial government
Phang Nga is divided into eight districts (amphoes), which are further divided into 48 subdistricts (tambons) and 314 villages (mubans).

Local government
As of 26 November 2019, there are: one Phang Nga Provincial Administration Organisation and 15 municipal (thesaban) areas in the province. Phang Nga and Takua Pa have town (thesaban mueang) status. Further 13 subdistrict municipalities (thesaban tambon). The non-municipal areas are administered by 36 Subdistrict Administrative Organisations - SAO (ongkan borihan suan tambon).

Transportation
 Roads: Hwy 4 is the main route that connects all districts in Phang Nga (except Kapong and Ko Yao). Hwy 401 connects Phang Nga to Surat Thani. Hwy 402 connects Phang Nga to Phuket province. Hwy 4090 connects Muang to Kapong District.
 Railways: There is no rail system in Phang Nga province. The nearest railway station is at Phunphin district, Surat Thani province.
 Bus: There are frequent buses to Bangkok and other provinces. There are also non air conditioned intra-provincial buses.
 Public transit: Songthaews are the most popular mode of public transportation in Phang Nga.
 Motorbike-taxi: These are found mainly in Phang Nga town and are used mainly for very short distances. Charges correspond to distance traveled.
 Airport: There is currently no airport in Phang Nga province. The nearest airport is Phuket International Airport. A future Phang Nga airport is proposed for the province, which will serve three provinces — Phang Nga, Krabi, and an alternative for the existing airport at Phuket.

Human achievement index 2017

Since 2003, United Nations Development Programme (UNDP) in Thailand has tracked progress on human development at sub-national level using the Human achievement index (HAI), a composite index covering all the eight key areas of human development. National Economic and Social Development Board (NESDB) has taken over this task since 2017.

National parks
There are six national parks, along with fourteen other national parks, make up region 5 (Nakhon Si Thammarat) of Thailand's protected areas. These national parks are diverse and surrounded by nature's gift.  
 Ao Phang Nga (Phang Nga Bay) National Park (อุทยานแห่งชาติอ่าวพังงา) was declared a national park on 29 April 981. The parks area is 250,000 rai ~  It has scenic views and features mass limestone formations scattered around in the sea near the shore. The same factors contribute to the density of caves in the area. The park is fertile with mangroves and there are a number of islands in the vicinity.

 Mu Ko Surin National Park (อุทยานแห่งชาติหมู่เกาะสุรินทร์) is an archipelago of five islands: Ko Surin Nuea, Ko Surin Tai, Ko Ri, Ko Khai, and Ko Klang. It was declared a national park on 9 July 1981. The national parks area is 88,282 rai ~ . The archipelago is in the Andaman Sea, near the Thai-Burmese oceanic border.
 Si Phang Nga National Park (อุทยานแห่งชาติศรีพังงา) was declared a national park on 16 April 1988. The park occupies an area of 153,800 rai ~ . The landscape of the park is dominated by rugged mountains covered with dipterocarp forests.

 Khao Lak–Lam Ru National Park (อุทยานแห่งชาติเขาหลัก-ลำรู่) was declared a national park on 30 August 1991. The park occupies an area of 78,125 rai ~  and covers Thai Mueang District, Kapong District, Takua Pa District, and Mueang District. The interesting attractions are: Khao Lak (เขาหลัก), which has the Chao Pho Khao Lak Shrine, Laem Pakarang (แหลมปะการัง) which has groves of pine, making it good for camping and relaxation, and Namtok Ton Chong Fa (น้ำตกโตนช่องฟ้า) or Ton Chong Fa Waterfall.
 Khao Lampi–Hat Thai Mueang National Park (อุทยานแห่งชาติเขาลำปี-หาดท้ายเหมือง) The park occupies an area of 44,950 rai ~ . It was declared a national park on 14 April 1988. Interesting attractions in the park include: Namtok Lampi (น้ำตกลำปี) is a 6-tiered waterfall that runs all year round; Namtok Ton Phrai (น้ำตกโตนไพร), a huge waterfall that runs all year round; and Hat Thai Mueang (หาดท้ายเหมือง), a long beach where the Sea Turtle Festival is held annually.
 Mu Ko Similan National Park (อุทยานแห่งชาติหมู่เกาะสิมิลัน) was declared a national park on 1 September 1982. The park occupies an area of 87,500 rai ~  Similan is a group of nine islands. Off-season is 16 May–31 October.

Wildlife sanctuary
There is one wildlife sanctuary, along with three other wildlife sanctuaries, make up region 5 (Nakhon Si Thammarat) of Thailand's protected areas. 
 Namtok Song Phraek Wildlife Sanctuary occupies an area of 138,712 rai ~ . The wildlife sanctuary was previously known as Ton Pariwat wildlife sanctuary and covers Kapong district, Mueang Phang Nga district and Thap Put district.

Gallery

References

External links

Provincial website

 
Provinces of Thailand
Andaman Sea
Southern Thailand